P. cornutus may refer to:
 Pagurus cornutus, a crab species in the genus Pagurus
 Perissolestes cornutus, a damselfly species in the genus Perissolestes
 Philautus cornutus, a frog species endemic to Indonesia
 Phrynobatrachus cornutus, a frog species
 Physocyclus cornutus, a house spider species in the genus Physocyclus
 Plancinus cornutus, a crab spider species in the genus Plancinus
 Platystethus cornutus, a beetle species in thegenus Platystethus
 Pleuronichthys cornutus, a flounder species
 Plexippoides cornutus, a jumping spider species in the genus Plexippoides

See also
 Cornutus (disambiguation)